Iron Stone Strategic Capital Partners (also called Iron Stone) is a real estate private equity firm located in Philadelphia, Pennsylvania that has a niche focus on value added real estate assets, the acquisition of real estate related operating companies, and the assumption of mortgage notes. As of 2012, Iron Stone has acquired and developed approximately $300 million in real estate related projects. Iron Stone was founded in 1995. The principals are Andrew Eisenstein, Jason Friedland, and Matthew Canno.

Urban Sustainability

Iron Stone focuses on urban sustainability. Iron Stone focuses on the "adaptive reuse" of older buildings in densely populated, older city neighborhoods.  By doing this, Iron Stone skips the wasteful demolition and reconstruction process. Furthermore, Iron Stone’s focus on real estate reuse does not contribute to the spread of urban sprawl.

Notable Projects

Falls Center
Iron Stone is responsible for the redevelopment of the Woman's Medical College of Pennsylvania in East Falls, Philadelphia, which served as the first women's medical teaching hospital in the United States. Before Iron Stone acquired it, the  hospital suffered from a number of rapid ownership changes and was finally abandoned in 2005 after the previous owner declared bankruptcy.  The huge complex continued exacerbating urban blight in Philadelphia until Iron Stone was able to acquire it in 2006 and begin the process of adaptive reuse. In 2008, the principals registered the property in the National Register of Historic Places to honor its significance as the nation's first women's medical school. 

Falls Center was originally constructed in the 1920s by Ritter & Shay, a prominent architecture firm in Philadelphia during the 1920s, and Iron Stone worked hard to preserve as much of the architectural elements as possible throughout the redevelopment process. The site has been successfully adapted for mixed-use student housing, commercial space and medical offices and has led to the creation of over 2,000 permanent full-time jobs. The Falls Center is home to over 18 businesses and is one of the largest centers of commerce in East Falls.

1425 Arch St
Iron Stone was responsible for the redevelopment of the long vacant Elkins Memorial YMCA, located at 1425 Arch St in Center City. This historic building was constructed in 1911 by the Gilded Age architect Horace Trumbauer. Using the existing floor plate as a guide, Iron Stone repositioned the former YMCA to house commercial office spaces, municipal operations, and a hotel with one of the only indoor pools in Center City.

Cooper Village
Iron Stone was selected by Cooper Hospital, Rowan University and the City of Camden to buy the vacant land adjacent to the Cooper Medical School, and develop it as apartments for the medical students of Cooper Hospital. The mixed-use project, located along the 400 block of South Broadway, salvages blighted buildings and intersperses ground-up five story buildings. This development utilizes historic tax credits, NJ Economic Redevelopment and Growth tax credits (ERG), CDBG funds, and HMFA "A Better Camden" funds.

Special Victims Unit 
The City of Philadelphia chose Iron Stone to design and develop a state of the art co-location facility for the Philadelphia Police Department's Special Victims Unit (SVU), the Department of Human Services (DHS) Sexual Abuse Investigations Unit, the Philadelphia Children's Alliance, and offices for the staff of the District Attorney. Located in Hunting Park, Philadelphia, Iron Stone used the existing envelope of a former truck terminal as the base of the development and subsequently added 10,000 square feet of new construction to complete the Warehouse Conversion to Office Space.

External links 
- Iron Stone Tapping Distressed Loan Fund

- Old Medical College of Pennsylvania Campus Shoring Up

- $50M fund will buy back bad real estate bank notes

- Falls Center undergoing new transformation
- Eastern U: New Philly campus, charter at old MCP
- Time capsule found at former Woman's Medical College building in East Falls
- GOLD AWARD: Falls Center Heritage Building, Philadelphia, Pa.
- Falls Center

References 

Real estate companies of the United States
Companies based in Philadelphia